Final results for the Softball competition at the 2000 Summer Olympics:

Medals

Schedule
Starting 17 September, there will be four preliminary games each day until 23 September for a total of 28 games. 
Two semi-final games played 25 September, with the game for third place same day. The final game for the gold medal played on 26 September at 7:30 pm local time.

Competition format
Eight teams competed in the Olympic softball tournament, and the competition consisted of two rounds. The preliminary round followed a round robin format, where each of the teams played all the other teams once. Following this, the top four teams advanced to a Page playoff system round consisting of two semifinal games, and finally the bronze and gold medal games.

Group stage
The top four teams advanced to the semifinal round.

Games
17 September

Preliminary round

Semi finals

Final

Grand final

Medal round
The loser of 1&2 seed game played the winner of the 3&4 seed game in the bronze medal match. The loser of the bronze medal match won the bronze medal while the winner went on to play the winner of the 1&2 seed game for the gold medal in the gold medal match.

Final team standings

References
 Official Olympic Report

2000 Summer Olympics events
2000
2000 in softball
Softball competitions in Australia